Metamuse (メタミューズ; stylized in all caps), formerly known as ZOC (ゾック; Zone Out of Control), is a Japanese alternative idol girl group that formed in September 2018. They released their debut single, "Family Name", on April 30, 2019. On July 7, 2022, the group changed its name to Metamuse.

History
On September 18, 2018, ZOC's line-up was revealed as Seiko Oomori, Karen Aizome, Kanano Senritsu, Katy Kashī, Marina Nishii, Fin Kitoki and Sayaka Unagi. In October, Fin Kitoki withdrew from the group.

On April 30, 2019, ZOC released their debut single, "Family Name", under T-Palette Records. Their second second, "Danshari Kareshi", was released on October 9. On December 23, Sayaka Unagi withdrew from the group.

On March 27, 2020, former Angerme member Maro Kannagi joined the group. On July 8, Kanano Senritsu withdrew from the group. Their third single, "Shinemagic / Hyalu Lonely Girl", was released on July 14. On July 15, the group suspended activities. They resumed activities on August 30. On October 1, Riko Yachia joined the group and the group announced that they would be making their major label debut with Avex Trax.

On January 20, 2021, the group released their fourth single, "Age of ZOC / Don't Trust Teenager. On February 8, Katy Kashī withdrew from the group. On May 13, Nodoka Shizume joined the group. On June 8, the group released their first studio album, PvP. On November 3, ZOC released a split single with Bis. On December 17, Jonah Kirano joined the group.

On April 20, 2022, ZOC announced that the would change their name to Metamuse on July 7. On May 28, Jonah Kirano withdrew from the group. On July 6, the group released their fifth single, "Tiffany Tiffany / Wagamama Pajama".

Members

Current
Seiko Oomori (大森靖子)
Karen Aizome (藍染カレン)
Marina Nishii (西井万理那)
Maro Kannagi (巫まろ)
Riko Yachia (雅雀り子)
Nodoka Shizume (鎮目のどか)

Former
Fin Kitoki (葵時フィン)
Sayaka Unagi (兎凪さやか)
Kanano Senritsu (戦慄かなの)
Katy Kashī (香椎かてぃ)
Jonah Kirano (吉良乃ジョナ)

Timeline

Discography

Studio albums

Singles

References

Japanese girl groups
Japanese idol groups
Japanese pop music groups
Musical groups from Tokyo
Musical groups established in 2018
2018 establishments in Japan